Maria Elisa Silva (born 7 May 1999), known simply as Elisa, is a Portuguese singer from Ponta do Sol, Madeira. She won Festival da Canção 2020 and would have represented Portugal in the Eurovision Song Contest 2020 held in Rotterdam, Netherlands with the song "Medo de sentir", but was cancelled due to the COVID-19 pandemic.

On 28 April 2021, it was announced that Elisa would be the spokesperson for Portugal announcing the countries points in the final of Eurovision Song Contest 2021.

Discography

Studio albums

Singles

References

Eurovision Song Contest entrants of 2020
Living people
1999 births
21st-century Portuguese women singers
Madeiran musicians